Prajnesh Gunneswaran (born 12 November 1989) is an Indian tennis player.
He has won 2 ATP Challenger and 8 ITF titles in singles and 1 ITF title in doubles.
He is currently the highest-ranked Indian singles player. He represents India at the Davis Cup. At the 2018 Asian Games in Jakarta, he won the bronze medal in the men's singles event.

Personal life

Prajnesh Gunneswaran is the son of Mr. S G Prabhakharan and Mrs. Usha. He married Sudarshana Pai in Ernakulam, Kerala in 2019.

Career

2010–2017: Early career
Gunneswaran mainly participated in ITF and ATP Challenger events in his early years. While he won eight ITF Futures singles titles, he found limited success on the Challenger tour.

In October 2016, he reached his first ATP Challenger singles final at Pune Challenger. He lost the title match to Frenchman Sadio Doumbia. In May 2017, he reached his first ATP Challenger doubles final at 2017 Samarkand Challenger. Partnering with compatriot Vishnu Vardhan, the pair lost the final to team of Laurynas Grigelis and Zdeněk Kolář.

Gunneswaran made his Davis Cup debut for India against Uzbekistan in April 2017.

2018: 2 ATP Challenger titles, Asian games Bronze Medal, Indian No. 1
2018 proved to be breakthrough year for Gunneswaran. He reached four ATP Challenger singles finals, winning two of them. He won his first ATP Challenger singles title at the Kunming Open by defeating Mohamed Safwat in the final. In an all-Indian final, he defeated Saketh Myneni at Bengaluru Open to lift his second Challenger singles trophy. He finished as runner-up at the Ningbo Challenger and Pune Challenger. In April he also reached his second ATP Challenger doubles final at Santaizi ATP Challenger in Taipei, where he partnered with Saketh Myneni.

At French Open, Gunneswaran lost in the final qualifying round. Although he was chosen as lucky loser after Nick Kyrgios withdrew from the competition, Gunneswaran could not participate in the main draw event as he had already left Paris before Kyrgios announced his withdrawal, thus failing to debut in the main draw of a Grand Slam event.

In August, he won the bronze medal in the men's singles tennis event at the 2018 Asian Games in Jakarta. He became the sixth Indian male athlete to win a medal in tennis at the Asian Games.

Gunneswaran started the season as World No. 243 in singles ranking. With solid performance on the Challenger tour he finished the season on a career-high ranking of No. 104 and became the highest ranked Indian singles player.

2019: Grand Slam main draw & top 100 debuts
Gunneswaran started the season by entering the Maharashtra Open, where he received a wildcard into the main draw. He lost in the first round to Michael Mmoh in straight sets.

At the Australian Open, he won the qualifying competition and debuted in the main draw of a Grand Slam event. He lost in the first round in straight sets to Frances Tiafoe.

On 11 February 2019, he reached a career-high singles ranking of No. 97, debuting in the top 100 singles rankings.

Gunneswaran came through the qualifying of the 2019 BNP Paribas Open and defeated Frenchman Benoit Paire in straight sets to enter the second round. He won his second round match against the 17th seed Nikoloz Basilashvili in three sets to make the third round of an ATP 1000 Tournament for the first time in his career. Gunneswaran's run at the Indian Wells Masters came to an end following a straight set defeat to Ivo Karlovic in the third round. This was Gunneswaran's maiden appearance at an ATP Masters event. Next, he qualified for the Miami Open, a back-to-back main draw appearance at a Masters event. He lost in the opening round to Jaume Munar.

In April, Gunneswaran reached his season's first ATP Challenger singles final at the Anning Challenger. He was the defending champion and lost to British player Jay Clarke in the final. As a result, he rose to a career-high singles ranking of No. 75. In July his ranking automatically enabled him entry to the main draw at Wimbledon, where he lost in the first round to Milos Raonic.

He lost to Daniil Medvedev at the US Open in the first round.

Challenger and Futures finals

Singles: 26 (10–16)

Doubles: 3 (1–2)

Singles performance timeline

Current through the 2022 Maharashtra Open.

Wins over top 20 players

References

External links
 
 
 

1989 births
Living people
Indian male tennis players
Racket sportspeople from Chennai
Tennis players at the 2018 Asian Games
Asian Games medalists in tennis
Medalists at the 2018 Asian Games
Tamil sportspeople
Asian Games bronze medalists for India